Joghghal-e Aviyeh (also Romanized as Joghghāl-e ʿAvīyeh; also known as Jafār, Jafār-e Pā’īn, Jaffāl-e Pā’īn, and Joghghāl-e Soflá) is a village in Jaffal Rural District, in the Central District of Shadegan County, Khuzestan Province, Iran. At the 2006 census, its population was 568, in 75 families.

References 

Populated places in Shadegan County